Zbigniew Dybol (born 22 February 1947) is a former Polish handball player who competed in the 1972 Summer Olympics and finished tenth with the Polish team.

External links
Profile  
Zbigniew Dybol

1947 births
Living people
Sportspeople from Poznań
Polish male handball players
Olympic handball players of Poland
Handball players at the 1972 Summer Olympics
Expatriate handball players
Polish expatriate sportspeople in Austria
Polish expatriate sportspeople in Germany